The 2014 UniCredit Czech Open was a professional tennis tournament played on clay courts. It was the 21st edition of the tournament which was part of the 2014 ATP Challenger Tour. It took place in Prostějov, Czech Republic between 2 and 7 June 2014.

Singles main-draw entrants

Seeds

 1 Rankings are as of May 26, 2014.

Other entrants
The following players received wildcards into the singles main draw:
  Robin Haase
  Adam Pavlásek
  Radek Štěpánek
  Jozef Kovalík

The following players received entry as alternates into the singles main draw:
  Theodoros Angelopoulos
  Benjamin Balleret
  Ricardo Hocevar

The following players received entry from the qualifying draw:
  Tristan Lamasine
  Daniel Knoflicek
  Julien Obry
  Michal Konečný

Doubles main-draw entrants

Seeds

1 Rankings as of May 26, 2014.

Other entrants
The following pairs received wildcards into the doubles main draw:
  Zdeněk Kolář /  David Poljak
  Michal Konečný /  Jaroslav Pospíšil
  Adam Pavlásek /  Jiří Veselý

Champions

Singles

 Jiří Veselý def.  Norbert Gombos, 6–2, 6–2

Doubles

 Andre Begemann /  Lukáš Rosol def.  Peter Polansky /  Adil Shamasdin, 6–1, 6–2

External links
 Official website

UniCredit Czech Open
Czech Open (tennis)
UniCredit Czech Open
UniCredit Czech Open